Haddon Hill is a prominent east–west aligned ridge in west Somerset, England, close to Hartford within the civil parish of Brompton Regis. Much of the upper part of the hill is mapped as open access under the Countryside and Rights of Way Act 2000 and hence available for public access on foot. A couple of public footpaths traverse the hill north–south whilst numerous tracks run along its length. The larger part of the hill is within the national park, the boundary of which runs along the B3190 road which runs diagonally across the eastern end of the ridge en route from Watchet to Bampton. Vehicular access is available off this road. The hill affords views across Wimbleball Reservoir which occupies the Haddeo valley immediately to its north.

Along with its eastern neighbour, Heydon Hill, Haddon Hill is largely formed from the Pickwell Down Sandstones, a thick sequence of Devonian age sedimentary rocks. The stone has been quarried in the past.

A tree ring, surrounded by a bank and ditch, on the hill was previously thought to be a Bronze Age tumulus although this is no longer the case. Several Roman coins have been found at Hadborough at the western end of Haddon Hill.

During World War II a military camp was built on the hill with several buildings to accommodate soldiers from the United States Army during the buildup to the Normandy landings in 1944.

References

External links

Hills of Somerset
Exmoor